Jean Jacques Bouhier (14 March 1666, in Dijon – 15 October 1744, in Dijon) was a French cleric and the first bishop of the Diocese of Dijon (holding it from 1731 until his death in 1743, when he was succeeded by his nephew Claude Bouhier de Lantenay).

References

1666 births
1744 deaths
Bishops of Dijon